Rajeev Ram and Joe Salisbury were the defending champions, but lost in the quarterfinals to John Peers and Michael Venus.

Peers and Venus went on to win the title, defeating Raven Klaasen and Oliver Marach in the final, 6–3, 6–2.

Seeds

Draw

Draw

Qualifying

Seeds

Qualifiers
  Henri Kontinen /  Jan-Lennard Struff

Qualifying draw

References

External Links
 Main draw
 Qualifying draw

Dubai Tennis Championships - Men's Doubles
2020 Dubai Tennis Championships